The Abondance is a cross breed of cattle which originated in the high valleys of Haute-Savoie, France.

Description
They are medium-sized, with the female weighing in at between 580 and 680 kilograms (kg) and standing 1.30 metres tall. They are golden brown in color with a white head (apart from the eyes), underside of the abdomen, and extremities of its legs. The bull weighs in at between 645 and 820 kilograms (kg) and stands 1.70 metres tall. Their colour is different, with a chestnut red and a bit of white on the head.

Their milk is rich in both fat and protein, with a good balance between the two. The milk is traditionally used to produce Appellation d'Origine Contrôlée (AOC) cheese such as the reblochon, abondance, tome des Bauges and the beaufort. Typical milk production is 5700 kg per lactation.

This breed of cattle is especially appreciated for its ability to withstand extreme variations in temperature, its fertility, its ease of breeding, its milk, its long life and its meat.

Origins
It comes from the Chablais in Haute-Savoie, where it was bred by the monks of the abbaye de Saint-Maurice d'Agaune since the 12th century. It was originally known as the chablaisienne.

Distribution
Currently, there are about 150,000 head of abondance in France. They have also been exported to North America, United Kingdom, New Zealand,  Iraq and Africa. In West Africa, they have been cross bred with N'dama.

See also
 Montbéliarde cattle

External link

Cattle breeds originating in France
Haute-Savoie
Cattle breeds